The Death Valley Germans (as dubbed by the media) were a family of four tourists from Germany who went missing in Death Valley National Park, on the California–Nevada border, in the United States, on 23 July 1996. Despite an intense search and rescue operation, no trace of the family was discovered and the search was called off. In 2009, the remains of the two adult members of the family were discovered by experienced hikers, Les Walker and Tom Mahood, who were carefully searching a remote area for evidence of the fate of the tourists, and conclusive proof of the fate of the male adult was later established.

Background

The family consisted of 34-year-old architect Egbert Rimkus, his 11-year-old son Georg Weber, Rimkus's 27-year-old girlfriend Cornelia Meyer and her 4-year-old son Max Meyer, all of who were from Dresden, Germany. The group arrived in the United States on 8 July 1996 at Seattle–Tacoma International Airport, immediately flying on to Los Angeles International Airport, where they rented a green 1996 Plymouth Voyager minivan. They spent some time in the San Clemente area of Southern California, then drove to Paradise, Nevada, where they stayed at the Treasure Island Hotel and Casino. During the trip, Egbert called home to Germany requesting $1,500 to be wired to them in California and then asked his ex-wife again before entering the park.

The family then drove to Death Valley National Park on 22 July, where they bought two copies of the "Death Valley National Monument Museum Text" (in German) at the Furnace Creek Visitors Center and spent their first night camping out in Hanaupah Canyon near Telescope Peak. The next day, the group traveled to various tourist sites, with Cornelia signing the names of all the family members on a visitors' log at an abandoned mining camp. She included with the signature that they would be headed over the pass, most likely indicating Mengel Pass. A U.S. flag taken from the Geologist's Cabin was discovered in the van, making it clear the Germans had also visited that location.

Disappearance and search 
The family had booked a flight from Los Angeles to return to Germany on 27 July 1996, but there was no evidence that they boarded the flight or departed the United States. Rimkus's ex-wife Heike Weber became concerned when her ex-husband and son did not return from their vacation, and she began to inquire about their whereabouts.

On 21 October 1996, the family's rental minivan was discovered in an extremely remote part of the park known as Anvil Spring by a Death Valley National Park (DVNP) ranger aboard a helicopter conducting a routine aerial surveillance mission looking for illegal drug manufacturing labs. The van had been reported stolen by the rental company and was determined to be the one rented to the tourists. A brand new Coleman sleeping bag, tent, numerous toys and an unused tire jack were all found inside the van. Over 200 search and rescue workers performed an extensive search of the area near the minivan. At the time, the search cost around $80,000 and included over 45 searchers at almost all times. Some groups involved were the China Lake Mountain Rescue Group and the Indian Wells Valley Search and Rescue Group. A ledge had been cleared next to the beer bottle with a seat mark indicating that one of the tourists, presumably Egbert due to the size of the mark, had used it for shade.

On 26 October 1996 the authorities called off the search for the missing tourists.

Discovery of remains
On 12 November 2009, Les Walker and Tom Mahood, two hikers who were off-duty search and rescue personnel looking for traces of the family, discovered the skeletal remains of two adults, one male and one female, with identification belonging to the missing tourists found near the remains. Cornelia's passport and bank ID were both found near the remains. Other belongings such as a journal with German writing and a wine bottle were found and attributed to the missing family. Although DNA was recovered only from the bones of Rimkus, authorities claimed they were fairly certain that the bones belonged to the missing tourists. The remains of the children were never officially discovered, although the sole of a shoe, possibly from one of the children, was found. Supposedly, bones resembling those of children were found by searchers near where the adults' remains were found, but no official report was made following up on this discovery.

Mahood speculated that, while vacationing in Death Valley on 23 July 1996, the family, short on time and wanting to visit Yosemite National Park on their way back to Los Angeles, attempted to take a shortcut to Yosemite on a route whose difficulty they underestimated. He believed they may have seen an AT&T tower and approached it to find help, but his field work led him to realize that the tower would not have been visible from their route. Mahood then explored the theory that their vehicle became stranded in a wash, the family traveled on foot southwards to seek help at Naval Air Weapons Station China Lake, where they may have expected to find a well-patrolled fenced perimeter, a common feature of military bases in Germany but not of military bases in the desert areas of the Southwestern United States.

See also
 List of solved missing person cases
 List of unsolved deaths

References

External links
 "The German Tourists in Death Valley - Disturbing deaths in U.S. national parks and deserts" - strangeoutdoors.com
 "The Hunt for the Death Valley Germans" - otherhand.org (archive link)
 "The Hunt for the Death Valley Germans - Companion Reading" - jaypenner.com

Unsolved deaths in the United States
Death Valley National Park
Missing German children
Formerly missing people
Panamint Range